Screamin' 'n' Bleedin' is the second album by British heavy metal band Angel Witch. The album was released in 1985 through Killerwatt Records. Even though this is the second release of the band, it is the first release with the new line-up of 1984, after  the split-up in 1981.

Track listing

In 2004, the album was re-issued by Archaic Temple Productions and included three live bonus tracks and new cover art.

Personnel
Angel Witch
David Tattum - lead vocals
Kevin Heybourne - guitars, backing vocals
Peter Gordelier - bass
Dave Hogg - drums

Production
Les Hunt - producer, engineer
Eddie Stevens - executive producer

References

1985 albums
Angel Witch albums